Hernán Vigna (born 26 April 1977) is a former Argentine footballer who played for clubs of Argentina, Chile, Mexico, Spain and Venezuela.

Honours

Club
Necaxa
FIFA Club World Cup: Third Place - 2000

Cobreloa
 Primera División de Chile (1): 2004 Clausura

References

 Profile at BDFA 

1977 births
Living people
Argentine footballers
Argentine expatriate footballers
Argentine expatriate sportspeople in Spain
Club Atlético Independiente footballers
Boca Juniors footballers
Club Atlético Huracán footballers
Cobreloa footballers
Club Necaxa footballers
Club Puebla players
Santos Laguna footballers
Cádiz CF players
Argentine Primera División players
Liga MX players
Chilean Primera División players
Segunda División B players
Expatriate footballers in Chile
Expatriate footballers in Mexico
Expatriate footballers in Spain
Expatriate footballers in Venezuela
Association football midfielders
San Telmo footballers
Caracas FC players
Argentine expatriate sportspeople in Chile
Argentine expatriate sportspeople in Mexico
Argentine expatriate sportspeople in Venezuela
Footballers from Buenos Aires